Pope Primus, also called Aprimos, was the 5th Pope and Patriarch of Alexandria. 

He was baptized by Mark the Evangelist. He was one of the three who were ordained priests by Mark, along with Bishop Anianus, the Second Patriarch. 

Primus was ascetic, pious, and filled with good deeds. He was appointed patriarch on the 22nd day of Paoni (June 16, 106 A.D.). During his reign, the church was in peace and tranquility. He is commemorated in the Coptic Synaxarion on the 3rd day of Mesra, in the fifth year of the reign of Hadrian.

References 

General

Atiya, Aziz S. The Coptic Encyclopedia. New York: Macmillan Publishing Co., 1991.

External links 
 The Official website of the Coptic Orthodox Pope of Alexandria and Patriarch of All Africa on the Holy See of Saint Mark the Apostle
 Coptic Documents in French

118 deaths
2nd-century Popes and Patriarchs of Alexandria
Saints from Roman Egypt
2nd-century Christian saints
Year of birth unknown